Osaka After Dark is the first live album by the Danish rock group D-A-D. The album was released on 25 October 1990 in Japan only.
The recordings was made during the group's tour of Japan, Singapore and Australia in April 1989.

Track listing
"Girl Nation"
"ZCMI"
"Rim Of Hell"
"Sleeping My Day Away"
"Lords Of The Atlas"
"Wild Talk"
"Overmuch"

External links
 This album on D-A-D's official homepage

1990 live albums
D.A.D. (band) albums